Union Village or "Bank Village" is a village and historic district located in North Smithfield and Woonsocket, Rhode Island on Rhode Island Route 146A.  Union Village developed because it was at the cross roads of old Great Road (Smithfield Road Historic District) (connecting Providence and Worcester, Massachusetts) and Pound Hill Road (connecting the Blackstone River falls to Chepachet and Connecticut).

History
Union Village was originally named Bank Village, and was the site of the first bank in northern Rhode Island, in 1805.  The area was part of the original Edward Inman-John Mowry purchase from the Native Americans in 1666.  Richard Arnold Jr. settled in the Union Village area in the late 17th century and the area was predominantly a farming community. In the 1800s the Bank in the village was called the Union Bank and the village received its name from the bank. The house containing the bank vault is still intact (2007). The Village was also home to the Bushee Academy, a prominent school in the nineteenth century. Union Village served as a way stop for travelers on the way to Boston, Worcester and Connecticut, and it was a commercial center through the 1820s. The Marquis de Lafayette allegedly dined at Seth Allen Tavern in Union Village when visiting the United States in 1824-25.

Today
There are numerous Federal-style houses, the "Smithfield Friends Meeting House, Parsonage & Cemetery" (Quaker) and a large historic cemetery in the area.  Wright's Farm on Woonsocket Hill Road has a popular dairy and pastry shop.

A  area of the village in North Smithfield, between Westwood Road and Woonsocket Hill Road, was listed on the National Register of Historic Places in 1978.

Notable people
Emeline S. Burlingame, suffragist

Images

See also
National Register of Historic Places listings in Providence County, Rhode Island

External links and references
Federal Writers Project, Rhode Island: A Guide to the Smallest State (Houghton Mifflin: Boston, 1937), pg. 378
Union Village info
Walter Nebiker, The History of North Smithfield (Somersworth, NH: New England History Press, 1976).

Historic districts on the National Register of Historic Places in Rhode Island
Villages in Providence County, Rhode Island
North Smithfield, Rhode Island
Woonsocket, Rhode Island
Villages in Rhode Island